Cyprian, formerly a Cypriot deacon, served as Greek Orthodox Patriarch of Alexandria between 1766 and 1783.

References
 

18th-century Greek Patriarchs of Alexandria
18th-century Cypriot people